Bauer is an unincorporated community in Marion County, in the U.S. state of Iowa.

History
St. Joseph's Catholic Church was founded in Bauer in 1853 and is now on the National Register of Historic Places.

St. Joseph's Catholic School of Bauer was founded in 1904. By 1919, it had 72 students.

The community's population was 20 in 1890, 25 in 1900, and 20 in 1920.

References

Unincorporated communities in Marion County, Iowa
Unincorporated communities in Iowa